Carpophilus freemani, or Freeman's sap beetle, is a species of sap-feeding beetle in the family Nitidulidae. It is found in North America, Oceania, and Europe.

References

Further reading

 

Nitidulidae
Articles created by Qbugbot
Beetles described in 1956